Lytle Creek, California, is an approximately  stream in southwestern San Bernardino County near the city of San Bernardino. It is a tributary of Warm Creek, a tributary of the Santa Ana River.  The Mormon settlers of San Bernardino named the stream "Lytle Creek" after their leader, Captain Andrew Lytle. The Tongva village of Wa’aachnga was located along Lytle Creek.

Lytle Creek Watershed 

Lytle Creek flows through the eastern San Gabriel Mountains and has three forks, the North, Middle and South forks.  The source of the creek is at the confluence of the North Fork and Middle Fork Lytle Creek, just west of the town of Lytle Creek, California .  South Fork Lytle Creek joins Lytle Creek soon afterward on the right .  As the creek 
emerges from the mountains, about where Glen Helen Parkway crosses the creek , the Lytle Creek Wash begins .  At the lower end of the wash , there is the old Lower Lytle Creek channel, that has been artificially canalized which splits off to the east, while an additional artificial diversion channel, the smaller Lytle Creek Channel , continues southeastward to rejoin the waters of Lytle Creek in the reach of Warm Creek 
near its mouth at Knoll Park .  The lower creek has its conjunction with the artificial channel of Warm Creek, 1 mile before Warm Creek joins the Santa Ana River.  Below this conjunction, the Lytle Creek Channel merges with the Warm Creek channel at Knoll Park just before it joins the river .

Several moderate-to-large-sized cities (Fontana, Rialto, Colton, and San Bernardino-the largest) are built on the ancient alluvial fan sediments left behind by Lytle Creek.

Lytle Creek
 -- mouth of Lytle Creek Wash, head of artificial channels, confluence with the Santa Ana River
Cajon Wash
Cable Creek
Lone Pine Creek
Crowder Creek
 -- head of Lytle Creek Wash, mouth of the upper reach of Lytle Creek
Grapevine Canyon Creek
Meyer Canyon Creek
 -- Miller Narrows
South Fork Lytle Creek
Bonita Creek
Middle Fork Lytle Creek
North Fork Lytle Creek
Coldwater Canyon Creek
Paiute Canyon
Dog Bone Canyon

Hydroelectric Power
Southern California Edison has a 600-kW hydroelectric plant on the stream at Miller Narrows at an elevation of 2795 feet.  It is a run-of-the-river plant.  A diversion dam sends the water through a turbine, which is returned to the streambed further downstream.

References

External links 
 

Rivers of San Bernardino County, California
San Gabriel Mountains
Tributaries of the Santa Ana River
Rivers of Southern California